Wendy Ann Watson (born 8 July 1960) is an English former cricketer who played as a left-handed batter and left-arm medium bowler. She appeared in 7 Test matches and 23 One Day Internationals for England between 1987 and 1993. Her final WODI appearance was in the final of the 1993 Women's Cricket World Cup. She played domestic cricket for East Midlands, Derbyshire and Nottinghamshire.

References

External links
 

1960 births
Living people
England women Test cricketers
England women One Day International cricketers
East Midlands women cricketers
Derbyshire women cricketers
Nottinghamshire women cricketers
People from Belper
Cricketers from Derbyshire